Bagan Luar is an area located within the town of Butterworth, Penang, Malaysia. To be precise, it is located between Bagan Jermal to the north and Bagan Dalam to the south. It is named after Kampung Bagan Luar which is a formerly a village located within the same area. Jalan Bagan Luar, or Bagan Luar Road, is a major road that runs through the centre of the area. The area is bordered by Butterworth Outer Ring Road (BORR) to the west, Jalan Telaga Air to the north, Jalan Chain Ferry to the south and Jalan Siram and Jalan Sungai Nyior to the east. Villages such as Kampung Benggali and Kampung Jawa is located within this area.

Notable landmarks located within this area include Dewan Haji Ahmad Badawi, Padang MPSP (Dataran Pemuda Merdeka), St. Mark's Church, Maha Mariamman Devasthanam Temple, Tian Gong Tan Temple, Seberang Perai Majistrate's Court, the Penang Dental College at NB Tower and the former headquarters of the Seberang Perai Municipal Council (MPSP).

See also
 Butterworth, Penang
 Bagan Dalam
 Bagan Jermal, Seberang Perai
 Bagan Ajam

References

External links

North Seberang Perai District
Populated places in Penang